Pujehun District is a district in the Southern Province of Sierra Leone. Pujehun District is one of the sixteen Districts of Sierra Leone. Its capital and largest city is the town of Pujehun . The other major towns in the district include Gandorhun, Zimmi, Gendema, Masam, Bomi and Potoru. As of 2015, the district has a population of 345,577.

The district of Pujehun borders the Atlantic Ocean in the southwest, the Republic of Liberia to the southeast, Kenema District to the northeast, Bo District to the north and Bonthe District to the west. It occupies a total space of 4,105 km2 and comprises twelve chiefdoms.

The population of Pujehun District is mainly from the Mende ethnic group, though minority ethnic groups are also found in the District. Pujehun District is a large Muslim majority district, though there is a significant Christian minority as well.

History
In 1982 the Ndogboyosoi (bush devil) War was fought in the district.

Geography
Pujehun District is located at the southeast corner of Sierra Leone bordering Atlantic Ocean in the southwest and the Liberia to the southeast.  The climate is tropical with a wet and dry seasons. At the 2004 census the population of Pujehun district was 234,234 the estimated population in 2010 was 276,970. The district has one of the lowest population densities of Sierra Leone, with most people living in villages of less than 2000 residents.

Economy
Diamond mining is a major economic activity in the district, as well as agricultural production of cassava, coffee, and cacao.

Government
Pejehun district has six Representatives in the Sierra Leonean Parliament, of which five members were elected to a 5-year term. Below are Pejehun district Representatives in the Parliament:
Matilda Lansana Minah – Paramount Chief of Pujehun district
Ansumana Jaia Kaikai (SLPP)
Sidie Tunis (SLPP)
Dixon Rogers (SLPP)
Dauda Fahundu (SLPP)
Senesie Fahundu (SLPP)

Administrative divisions

Chiefdoms
The district is made up of twelve chiefdoms as the third level of administrative subdivision.

Barri – Potoru
Gallines Perri – Blama
Kpaka – Masam
Kpanga Kagonde – Pujehun
Makpele – Zimmi
Malen – Sahn
Mano Sakrim – Gbonjema
Panga Krim – Gobaru
Peje – Futta
Soro Gbema – Fairo
Sowa – Bandajuma
Yekomo Kpukumu Krim – Karlu

Religion

References

External links
http://www.daco-sl.org/encyclopedia/7_lib/7_2k_pu.htm

Districts of Sierra Leone
Southern Province, Sierra Leone